KUJ-FM(99.1 FM) is a Top 40 Mainstream station licensed to Burbank, Washington serving the Tri-Cities, Washington area. The Station is currently owned by Stephens Media Group. The New Northwest Broadcasters outlet broadcast at 99.1 MHz on the FM dial with an effective radiated power of 52,000 watts. The transmitter is located on Jump Off Joe.

History
KUJ-FM was originally the sister station of AM news/talk station, having signed on the air in 1996 with its Rhythmic CHR format. In 1999, under the direction of Program Director Dave Hilton, KUJ-FM shifted from Rhythmic to Mainstream CHR, thus garnering the station its highest 18-34 ratings ever. Unable to sell the stations high ratings, New Northwest Broadcasters, under the direction of Scotty Brink and Jeff Jacobs shifted KUJ-FM back in the Rhythmic direction in the Spring of 2002, and subsequently fired Hilton. KUJ-FM returned to Mainstream CHR in March 2007, suggesting that the previous change to the same format was the correct direction for the station at the time.

External links
Power 99's website

Radio stations established in 1996
UJ-FM
Contemporary hit radio stations in the United States